is the eighth instalment in the Time Bokan series. Set in the near future, the world is shaken by a couple of young thieves named Kiramekiman, who issue warnings before they go into action. Once they set their sights on a target, they never fail to steal it. Meanwhile, a detective trio is in pursuit of the Kiramekiman group but are unable to catch them. Secretly, the goal of Kiramekiman is actually noble, since they are only stealing certain objects in order to maintain peace in the future.

Cast

Kiramekiman
 Lip - Tomoko Kawakami
 Puff - Kōsuke Okano
 Kirameeru - Etsuko Kozakura
 Professor Rikiddo - Minoru Yada

Flower Detective Trio
 Ruuju - Noriko Ohara
 Hieeru - Jōji Yanami
 Ondoore - Kazuya Tatekabe
 Mr. Dogurin - Junpei Takiguchi
 Dokku Ringo - Masayuki Yamamoto

Je t'aime
 Eaude Cologne - Shin Aomori
 Mascarra - Misa Watanabe
 Metro - Toshihiko Nakajima
 Cinema - Junichi Endō
 Chateau - Eiji Sekiguchi
 Komantare - Mikako Takahashi

Other
 Narrator - Junpei Takiguchi

Episode list

References

External links
 

2000 anime television series debuts
Science fiction anime and manga
Tatsunoko Production
Time Bokan Series
TV Tokyo original programming